Protithona fugitivana is a species of moth of the family Tortricidae. It is endemic to New Zealand.

The wingspan is 9–10 mm for males and 10–12 mm for females. The forewings are dull to bright ochreous, mixed with dark fuscous. There is a white or pale-ochreous streak from the base to one third of the wing, margined beneath by a dark-fuscous blotch. The forewings of the females are almost wholly suffused with greyish fuscous. The hindwings are greyish fuscous.

The larvae feed on Potamogeton species.

References

Moths described in 1883
Eucosmini
Moths of New Zealand
Endemic fauna of New Zealand
Taxa named by Edward Meyrick
Endemic moths of New Zealand